This article summarizes publicly known attacks against block ciphers and stream ciphers. Note that there are perhaps attacks that are not publicly known, and not all entries may be up to date.

Table color key

Best attack 
This column lists the complexity of the attack:
 If the attack doesn't break the full cipher, "rounds" refers to how many rounds were broken
 "time"  — time complexity, number of cipher evaluations for the attacker
 "data" — required known plaintext-ciphertext pairs (if applicable)
 "memory" — how many blocks worth of data needs to be stored (if applicable)
 "related keys" — for related-key attacks, how many related key queries are needed

Common ciphers

Key or plaintext recovery attacks
Attacks that lead to disclosure of the key or plaintext.

Distinguishing attacks

Attacks that allow distinguishing ciphertext from random data.

Less common ciphers

Key recovery attacks
Attacks that lead to disclosure of the key.

Distinguishing attacks

Attacks that allow distinguishing ciphertext from random data.

See also
 Block cipher
 Hash function security summary
 Time/memory/data tradeoff attack
 Transport Layer Security
 Bullrun (decryption program) — a secret anti-encryption program run by the U.S. National Security Agency

References

Cryptography lists and comparisons